Hanni or Hänni may refer to:

People with the surname
 Johannes-Andreas Hanni (1957–1982), Estonian serial killer
 Kate Hanni, founder of American consumer advocacy organization FlyersRights.org
 Liia Hänni (born 1946), Estonian astrophysicist and politician
 Sofiane Hanni (born 1990), Algerian professional footballer
 Uku Hänni (born 1943), Estonian astrophysicist and civil servant
 Wilf Hanni, Canadian politician and oil industry consultant

People with the given name
 Hanni Bjartalíð (born 1968), Faroese painter
 Hanni Ehlers (born 1954), German translator
 Hanni Ossott (1946–2002), Venezuelan poet
 Hanni Wenzel (born 1956), Liechtensteiner alpine skier
 Hanni Pham (born 2004), Vietnamese-Australian singer and dancer, member of K-pop group NewJeans

See also
 Hanna (disambiguation)
 Hanne
 Hanno (disambiguation)
 Hannu (disambiguation)

Estonian-language surnames